Xenia Township may refer to the following townships in the United States:

 Xenia Township, Clay County, Illinois
 Xenia Township, Greene County, Ohio